In the beginning of the 20th century, the Fathers of the Holy Sepulchre, or Guardians of the Holy Sepulchre, were six or seven Franciscan fathers, who along with as many lay brothers kept watch over the Church of the Holy Sepulchre and its sanctuaries.

According to the 1913 edition of the Catholic Encyclopedia:

See also
 Custody of the Holy Land
 Order of the Holy Sepulchre
 Brotherhood of the Holy Sepulchre

References

Custody of the Holy Land
Church of the Holy Sepulchre